= Protective Enclosures Company =

- Type: Private
- Industry: Television accessories and enclosures
- Founded: 2009

Protective Enclosures Company (PEC) is a privately owned accessory company that produces enclosures for TVs. The company was founded in 2009 as a manufacturer of water-resistant outdoor TV enclosures.

== History ==
The company was launched in 2009.

In October 2016, PEC announced a partnership with Philips in the production of outdoor digital signage solutions.

== Products ==
In 2013, PEC introduced The Display Shield. In 2015, PEC produced a hybrid metal digital display enclosure, The TV Shield PRO.

== Recognition ==
In 2020, a report by Advance Market Analysis named PEC's TV Shield among the "top players in the outdoor TV market". The firm was recognized at several special features in media and TV.
